Cheyenne is a 1947 American western film directed by Raoul Walsh and starring Dennis Morgan, Jane Wyman, Janis Paige and Bruce Bennett. It was produced and released by Hollywood major Warner Bros.

Plot
Jim Wylie is a gambler in Laramie, Wyoming Territory who is wanted by the Nevada law. He gets a proposal from a Wells Fargo agent; if he can help locate a bandit known as "The Poet" who has been robbing stagecoaches, all pending charges will be dropped and Jim can even claim a cash reward.

His stage to Cheyenne has a pair of female passengers, Ann Kincaid and saloon singer Emily Carson, when their coach is ambushed by the Sundance Kid and his gang. But when he opens the strongbox, Sundance is furious to find nothing but a mocking poem from The Poet.

Jim pretends to be The Poet to infiltrate his gang. What he doesn't know is that Ann is married to the notorious outlaw. She goes along with the ruse to see where it leads. Her husband, the real Poet, is Ed Landers, a trusted Wells Fargo employee, who promises to pull one last job and then get away with Ann safely to San Francisco.

Sundance is once again foiled on a job by the Poet getting there first, and three of Sundance's men are killed. He realizes that Ann has double-crossed him. Jim confides to Landers his true identity, not realizing Landers is the man he's after. Landers promptly tells Cheyenne's sheriff that Jim is not just pretending to be the Poet, but is him.

Ann detects a whiff of perfume on Landers that she recognizes. It is Emily's, proof to Ann that her lying, thieving husband plans to take Emily away to San Francisco instead of her. On his next holdup attempt, Landers is shot dead by Jim.

All is well until Jim is told that unless he can also recover The Poet's stolen money, there will be no reward. He is dejected until Ann, leaving town on the stage, tosses him two sacks filled with money. A delighted Jim gallops off to catch up with her.

Cast
 Dennis Morgan as James Wylie
 Jane Wyman as Ann Kincaid
 Janis Paige as Emily Carson
 Bruce Bennett as Ed Landers
 Alan Hale Sr. as Fred Durkin
 Arthur Kennedy as The Sundance Kid
 John Ridgely as Challkeye 
 Barton MacLane as Webb Yancey 
 Tom Tyler as Pecos 
 Bob Steele as Bucky 
 John Compton as Limpy Bill
 John Alvin as Single Jack
 Monte Blue as Timberline
 Anne O'Neal as Miss Kittredge (as Ann O'Neal)
 Tom Fadden as Charlie
 Britt Wood as Swamper

Box office
According to Warner Bros records, the film earned $2,506,000 domestically and $797,000 foreign.

Anecdotes 
The film centers around the mysterious "poet" bandit, who robs Wells Fargo stagecoaches. The inspiration for this may have come from a notorious outlaw of similar methodology, Black Bart.

See also
 List of American films of 1947

References

External links 
 

1947 films
1947 Western (genre) films
American Western (genre) films
Films directed by Raoul Walsh
Films scored by Max Steiner
Films set in Wyoming
American black-and-white films
Warner Bros. films
1940s English-language films
1940s American films